Susie Hargreaves  is a British executive who works in the charity sector. She is Chief Executive officer of the Internet Watch Foundation.

Early life  
Hargreaves was raised in Yorkshire, in a family of nine.

Career 
Hargreaves has held a number of executive positions in the arts, including general manager of Red Ladder Theatre Company, deputy director of Watermans Arts Centre, and CEO of Audiences Yorkshire. In 2002, she founded CultureWorks UK, a business development company. In November 2008, she became CEO of the Society of Dyers and Colourists.

Since her appointment in September 2011, she has been CEO of the Internet Watch Foundation. She is a director of the UK Safer Internet Centre.

Personal life 
She is married to actor and director Marcus Romer; they have two children.

Honours 
Hargreaves was a finalist for a European Women of Achievement Award in 2004, as Executive of the Year in the 2017 ISPA Awards, and in the 2018 European CEO Awards. In 2006, she was awarded a Clore Leadership Fellowship.

In 2016, she was awarded an OBE for Services to Child Online Protection in the Queen's Birthday Honours.

References 

Living people
Year of birth missing (living people)
Businesspeople from Yorkshire
Officers of the Order of the British Empire